Poile may refer to:

Surname:
Bud Poile (1924–2005), professional ice hockey player, coach, general manager, and league executive
David Poile (born 1949), the Executive Vice President of Hockey Operations and General Manager of the NHL's Nashville Predators
Don Poile (born 1932), retired professional ice hockey player who played 66 games in the National Hockey League with the Detroit Red Wings

Given name:
Poile Sengupta, born in 1948 as Ambika Gopalakrishnan

Geography:
La Poile Bay, natural bay in Newfoundland, Canada
La Poile, Newfoundland and Labrador, settlement on La Poile Bay
Burgeo-La Poile, provincial electoral district for the House of Assembly of Newfoundland and Labrador, Canada
Poile Zedek Synagogue, historic synagogue at 145 Neilson Street in New Brunswick, New Jersey

See also
Norman R. "Bud" Poile Trophy, presented annually
Norman R. "Bud" Poile Trophy (IHL), awarded annually
Poilley (disambiguation)
Poilly
Pouilly (disambiguation)
Pouillé (disambiguation)